Cumberland is a future unitary local government area in north-west England. Together with Westmorland and Furness, it will be formally established on 1 April 2023 when Cumbria County Council is abolished. The council area will consist of the areas covered by the current districts of Allerdale, Carlisle and Copeland, which will also cease to function. It will cover 77% of the area of, and 90% of the population of, the historic county of Cumberland. 

The authority will sit within the ceremonial county of Cumbria, which will no longer have any administrative function. 

The authority is named after the historic county of Cumberland, which was abolished for administrative purposes in 1974. Penrith and the surrounding area is the part of the historic county which is excluded from the new council area. Penrith will instead fall within Westmorland and Furness.

Governance
The first elections to Cumberland Council took place in May 2022, with the council acting as a 'shadow authority' until the abolition of the three former district councils and Cumbria County Council on 1 April 2023. Labour won a majority of 30 seats. Conservatives have 7 seats, Liberal Democrats 4 seats, Independents 3 seats and Green Party 2 seats. Turnout was 36.1%.

Name
The district will cover broadly the same area as the historic county of Cumberland, except for the Penrith area which will be in Westmorland and Furness. Cumberland was previously an administrative county until it was abolished by the Local Government Act 1972 and replaced with Cumbria.

History
Elections to Cumbria County Council were due to take place in May 2021 but were postponed by the Secretary of State for Housing, Communities and Local Government for one year due to a consultation on local government reorganisation in the area. In July 2021, the government announced that the current authorities in Cumbria would be abolished and replaced with two unitary authorities in the form of an 'east/west split' of the county.

Opponents of the reorganisation claimed that the proposal was pursued to benefit the electoral prospects of the Conservative Party. Cumbria County Council, which would be abolished under the plans, sought judicial review to prevent the reorganisation from taking place. The judicial review was refused by the High Court in January 2022. Draft statutory instruments to bring about local government reorganisation in Cumbria were subsequently laid before parliament. The Cumbria (Structural Changes) Order 2022 (2022 No. 331) was made on 17 March 2022 and came into force the following day. Cumberland, together with neighbouring Westmorland and Furness, will continue to constitute a ceremonial county named "Cumbria" for the purpose of lieutenancy and shrievalties, being presided over by a Lord Lieutenant of Cumbria and a High Sheriff of Cumbria. Police services is be provided by Cumbria Constabulary overseen by the Cumbria Police and Crime Commissioner, High Sheriffs pay attention to the work of such statutory bodies as the Police, the Prison Service and the Probation Service.

See also

2019–2023 structural changes to local government in England

References

External links
Cumberland Shadow Authority
Cumberland Joint Committee
Two New Councils for Cumbria

Local government in Cumbria
Unitary authority districts of England
Local government districts of Cumbria
Organizations established in 2023
2023 establishments in England